Eric Adlercreutz (born 1935 in Helsinki) is a Finnish architect, and head of the Helsinki-based architecture firm A-Konsultit, founded in 1962 together with his wife Gunnel Adlercreutz. His reputation is based on having won over twenty national architecture competitions over the duration of his career. He is also a former employee of famous Finnish architect Alvar Aalto. Nowadays he is also chairman of the Finnish Committee for the Restoration of Viipuri Library, one of Aalto's most famous works. Adlercreutz studied architecture at Helsinki University of Technology (where he has also taught, 1966–1970) and University of California, Berkeley, USA, in 1968–69.

The style of the A-Konsultit office is based generally on two factors: Alvar Aalto's influence on Adlercreutz; and Adlercreutz's particular interest in town planning and housing, especially social housing and community building. The office has also specialized in restoration.

A selection of buildings designed by A-Konsultit 
Kamppi housing area and senior citizen service centre, Helsinki, 1984–1989.
Leskenenlehti school and daycare centre, Helsinki, 2002–2003.
Svenska Handelshögskolan, University of Helsinki, restoration, 1983.
Kivikko service centre, health care and senior citizen's centre, 1997.
 Lehtovuori housing area, Konala, Helsinki, 2002.

References 
Alvar Aalto Library in Vyborg: Saving a Modern Masterpiece. Rakennustieto, Helsinki, 2009.

External links 
 A-Konsultit web site

Finnish architects
Modernist architects
1935 births
Living people

Eric